Nolberto is a masculine given name. Notable people with the name include:

Nolberto Herrera (died 2014), Mexican journalist
Nolberto Molina (born 1953), Colombian footballer and manager
Nolberto Solano (born 1974), Peruvian footballer and manager

See also
Norberto

Masculine given names